Orthaga confusa is a species of snout moth in the genus Orthaga. It is found in Taiwan.

References

Moths described in 1917
Epipaschiinae
Endemic fauna of Taiwan